The Garnavillo Township Bridge is a historic structure located west of Garnavillo, Iowa, United States. Around the turn of the 20th-century Clayton County embarked on a project to replace its old bridges. On short crossing like this one they generally chose simple timber stringer structures. But for this one, and several others, they chose to take advantage of the large limestone deposits in the county. They contracted with stonemason A.C. Boyle of McGregor, Iowa to build this single deck arch bridge for $1,462.72. It replaced an old combination truss span. This bridge also been replaced, but it remains in place underneath the newer bridge. It was listed on the National Register of Historic Places in 1998.

References

Bridges completed in 1902
Bridges in Clayton County, Iowa
National Register of Historic Places in Clayton County, Iowa
Road bridges on the National Register of Historic Places in Iowa
Arch bridges in Iowa
Stone arch bridges in the United States